Tang Lingsheng (born 1971 in Lingui, Guangxi) is a male Chinese weightlifter.

Major performances 
1989 National Junior Games - 3rd 56 kg (262.5 kg);
1991 National Inter-city Games - 2nd 60 kg (280 kg);
1992 National Championships - 3rd 60 kg (295 kg);
1993 World Championships - 3rd 59 kg (292.5 kg);
1994 Asian Games - 2nd 59 kg
1995 Asian Championships - Winning three titles and breaking an AR;
1995 World Championships - 1st 59 kg in clean and jerk;
1996 Atlanta Olympic Games - 1st 59 kg (WR);

References 

China Daily

1971 births
Living people
Chinese male weightlifters
Olympic weightlifters of China
Weightlifters at the 1996 Summer Olympics
Olympic gold medalists for China
Olympic medalists in weightlifting
Asian Games medalists in weightlifting
Weightlifters from Guangxi
People from Guilin
Weightlifters at the 1994 Asian Games
Medalists at the 1996 Summer Olympics
Asian Games silver medalists for China
Medalists at the 1994 Asian Games
20th-century Chinese people